Lin Ying-shin (born 22 April 1999) is a Taiwanese sports shooter. She won her first gold medal at the 2018 ISSF World Cup in Munich in the 10 m air rifle. Lin started off the 2018 season by winning a Junior World Cup silver medal in Sydney, and then claimed a silver in the open category at the ISSF World Cup stage 2 in Changwon. Lin competed at the 2018 Asian Games, and claimed the first gold medal for the Chinese Taipei contingent after finished in the first place in the mixed 10 metre air rifle team event partnered with Lu Shao-chuan. She finished third at the International Shooting Sport Federation World Cup in 2019, guaranteeing a place at the 2020 Summer Olympics.

References

External links

1999 births
Living people
Taiwanese female sport shooters
ISSF rifle shooters
Shooters at the 2018 Asian Games
Asian Games gold medalists for Chinese Taipei
Medalists at the 2018 Asian Games
Asian Games medalists in shooting
Universiade silver medalists for Chinese Taipei
Universiade bronze medalists for Chinese Taipei
Universiade medalists in shooting
Medalists at the 2019 Summer Universiade
Olympic shooters of Taiwan
Shooters at the 2020 Summer Olympics